Devil's Daughter may refer to:

Films
 The Devil's Daughter (1915 film), a lost 1915 American silent drama film directed by Frank Powell
 The Devil's Daughter (1939 film), a 1939 American film directed by Arthur H. Leonard
 The Devil's Daughter (1973 film), a 1973 American made-for-television horror film
 The Devil's Daughter (1991 film), a 1991 Italian horror film co-written and produced by Dario Argento

Music
 "Devil's Daughter", the third song on Uriah Heep's 1975 album Return to Fantasy
 "Devil's Daughter (Holy War)", the second song on Ozzy Osbourne's 1988 album No Rest for the Wicked
 "Devil's Daughter", the second song on Silvertide's 2004 album Show and Tell

People
 Sharon Carr, Britain's youngest female murderer, dubbed "The Devil's Daughter" in the press

Other
 The Devil's Daughter (painting), a 1917 painting by Welsh society artist Margaret Lindsay Williams
 Sherlock Holmes: The Devil's Daughter, an adventure mystery video game

See also
 Devil Bat's Daughter
 "Devil's Son"
 Jean, the Soldier, and Eulalie, the Devil's Daughter, a mythical French story
 Lucy, the Daughter of the Devil, an animated show written and directed by Loren Bouchard
 Satana (Marvel Comics), a fictional character from Marvel related comics
 "Sorrow" (The McCoys song), which includes the line "Something tells me you're a devil's daughter"
 To the Devil a Daughter, a 1976 British-West German horror film